The subfamily Caprinae, also sometimes referred to as the tribe Caprini, is part of the ruminant family Bovidae, and consists of mostly medium-sized bovids. A member of this subfamily is called a caprine, or, more informally, a goat-antelope (although they are not considered antelopes).

Within this tribe, a prominent clade includes sheep and goats. Some earlier taxonomies considered Caprinae a separate family called Capridae (with the members being caprids), but now it is usually considered either a subfamily within the Bovidae, or a tribe within the subfamily Antilopinae of the family Bovidae, with caprines being a type of bovid.

Characteristics

Although most goat-antelopes are gregarious and have fairly stocky builds, they diverge in many other ways – the muskox (Ovibos moschatus) is adapted to the extreme cold of the tundra; the mountain goat (Oreamnos americanus) of North America is specialised for very rugged terrain; the urial (Ovis orientalis) occupies a largely infertile area from Kashmir to Iran, including much desert country. The Armenian mouflon (Ovis  gmelini gmelini) is thought to be the ancestor of the modern domestic sheep (Ovis aries).

Many species have become extinct since the last ice age, probably largely because of human interaction. Of the survivors:
Five are classified as endangered,
Eight as vulnerable,
Seven as of concern and needing conservation measures, but at lower risk, and
Seven species are secure.

The lifestyles of caprids fall into two broad classes: 'resource-defenders', which are territorial and defend a small, food-rich area against other members of the same species; and 'grazers', which gather together into herds and roam freely over a larger, usually relatively infertile area.

The resource-defenders are the more primitive group: they tend to be smaller in size, dark in colour, males and females fairly alike, have long, tessellated ears, long manes, and dagger-shaped horns. The grazers (sometimes collectively known as tsoan caprids, from the Hebrew tso'n meaning sheep and goats) evolved more recently. They tend to be larger, highly social, and rather than mark territory with scent glands, they have highly evolved dominance behaviours. No sharp line divides the groups, but a continuum varies from the serows at one end of the spectrum to sheep, true goats, and musk oxen at the other.

Evolution
 
The goat-antelope, or caprid, group is known from as early as the Miocene, when members of the group resembled the modern serow in their general body form. The group did not reach its greatest diversity until the recent ice ages, when many of its members became specialised for marginal, often extreme, environments: mountains, deserts, and the subarctic region.

The ancestors of the modern sheep and goats (both rather vague and ill-defined terms) are thought to have moved into mountainous regions – sheep becoming specialised occupants of the foothills and nearby plains, and relying on flight and flocking for defence against predators, and goats adapting to very steep terrain where predators are at a disadvantage.

Internal relationships of Caprinae based on mitochondrial DNA.

Species
Phylogeny based on Hassanin et al., 2009 and Calamari, 2021.

Family Bovidae
 Subfamily Caprinae or Tribe Caprini
{| class="wikitable"
|-
! Tribe or Subtribe
! Image
! Genus
! Species
|-
! rowspan="10" style="text-align:center;"|  Caprini or Caprina
|
|Ammotragus 
|
 Barbary sheep, Ammotragus lervia
|-
|
|Arabitragus 
|
 Arabian tahr, Arabitragus jayakari
|-
|
|Budorcas 
|
 Takin, Budorcas taxicolor
|-
|
|Capra 
|
 West Asian ibex, Capra aegagrus
Bezoar ibex, Capra aegagrus aegagrus
 Sindh ibex, Capra aegagrus blythi
 West Caucasian tur, Capra caucasica
 East Caucasian tur, Capra cylindricornis
 Markhor, Capra falconeri
Domestic goat, Capra hircus
 Alpine ibex, Capra ibex
 Nubian ibex, Capra nubiana
 Iberian ibex, Capra pyrenaica
 Western Spanish ibex, Capra pyrenaica victoriae
 Southeastern Spanish ibex, Capra pyrenaica hispanica
 †Portuguese ibex, Capra pyreneaica lusitanica
 †Pyrenean ibex, Capra pyreneaica pyrenaica
 Siberian ibex, Capra sibirica
 Walia ibex, Capra walie
|-
|
|Hemitragus 
|
 Himalayan tahr, Hemitragus jemlahicus'
|-
|
|Nilgiritragus 
|
 Nilgiri tahr, Nilgiritragus hylocrius|-
|
|Oreamnos 
|
 Mountain goat, Oreamnos americanus|-
|
|Ovis 
|
 Argali, Ovis ammonMarco Polo sheep, Ovis ammon polii Domestic sheep, Ovis aries Bighorn sheep, Ovis canadensis Dall sheep, Ovis dalli Mouflon, Ovis gmelini Snow sheep, Ovis nivicola Urial, Ovis vignei|-
|
|Pseudois 
|
 Bharal (Himalayan blue sheep), Pseudois nayaur|-
|
|Rupicapra 
|
 Pyrenean chamois, Rupicapra pyrenaica Alpine chamois, Rupicapra rupicapra|-
! rowspan="3" style="text-align:center;"|  Ovibovini or Ovibovina|
|Capricornis 
|
 Japanese serow, Capricornis crispus Chinese serow, Capricornis milneedwardsii Red serow, Capricornis rubidus Sumatran serow, Capricornis sumatraensis Taiwan serow, Capricornis swinhoeiHimalayan serow Capricornis thar|-
|
|Nemorhaedus 
|
 Red goral, Nemorhaedus baileyi Long-tailed goral, Naemorhedus caudatus Gray goral, Nemorhaedus goral Chinese goral, Nemorhaedus griseus|-
|
|Ovibos 
|
 Muskox, Ovibos moschatus|-
! rowspan="1" style="text-align:center;"|  Pantholopini or Pantholopina|
|Pantholops 
|
Tibetan antelope, Pantholops hodgsonii|-
|}

Fossil genera
The following extinct genera of Caprinae have been identified:

 Tribe Caprini
 Genus Myotragus †
 Myotragus balearicus†
 Tribe Ovibovini
 Genus Bootherium †
 Bootherium bombifrons†
 Genus Euceratherium †
 Euceratherium collinum†
 Genus Makapania †
 Makapania broomi†
 Genus Megalovis †
 Genus Soergelia †
 Soergelia mayfieldi†
 Genus Tsaidamotherium †
 Tsaidamotherium brevirostrum†
 Tsaidamotherium hedini†

Unsorted

†Benicerus†Boopsis†Capraoryx†Caprotragoides†Criotherium†Damalavus†Gallogoral†Lyrocerus†Mesembriacerus†Neotragocerus†Nesogoral†Norbertia†Numidocapra†Oioceros†Olonbulukia†Pachygazella†Pachytragus†Palaeoreas†Palaeoryx†Paraprotoryx†Parapseudotragus†Parurmiatherium†Praeovibos†Procamptoceras†Prosinotragus†Protoryx†Protovis†Pseudotragus†Qurliqnoria†Samotragus†Sinocapra†Sinomegoceros†Sinopalaeoceros†Sinotragus†Sivacapra†Sporadotragus†Tethytragus†Tossunnoria†Turcocerus†Urmiatherium''

References

 
Extant Miocene first appearances
Taxa named by John Edward Gray
Mammal subfamilies